Nociūnai (formerly) is a village in Kėdainiai district municipality, in Kaunas County, in central Lithuania. According to the 2011 census, the village had a population of 304 people. There is a library, a community center, a former school, a cemetery, an ancient burial site.

History
The Nociūnai Manor was a property of the Šiukštos family in the 19th century. There was a wooden familial tomb-chapel, built in 1805.

During the Soviet era, Nociūnai was a center of the "Spike" kolkhoz.

Demography

Images

References

Villages in Kaunas County
Kėdainiai District Municipality